Isochorismate synthase is an isomerase enzyme that catalyzes the first step in the biosynthesis of vitamin K2 (menaquinone) in Escherichia coli.

Reaction 
Isochorismate synthase, belongs to the isomerase enzyme family.  More specifically it is classified as an intramolecular transferase because it transfers the hydroxy group of chorismate between carbons. 

Isochorismate synthase catalyzes the irreversible conversion of chorismate to isochorismate:

Isochorismate synthase is most active at 37 °C and at a pH between 7.5 and 8. It requires Mg2+ as a cofactor, in a concentration between 100 μM and 1 mM. Inhibitors of isochorismate synthase include:
	
 (4R,5R)-4-hydroxy-5-(1-carboxyvinyloxy)-cyclohex-1-ene carboxylate
 (4R,5R)-4-hydroxy-5-carboxymethoxy-cyclohex-1-enecarboxylate
 (4R,5R)-5-(2-carboxy-allyloxy)-4-hydroxy-cyclohex-1-enecarboxylate
 (4R,5R,6S)-6-ammonio-5-[(1-carboxylatoethenyl)oxy]-4-hydroxycyclohex-1-ene-1-carboxylate
 (4R,5R,7R)-5-(1-carboxy-ethoxy)-4-hydroxy-cyclohex-1-enecarboxylate
 (4R,5R,7S)-5-(1-carboxy-ethoxy)-4-hydroxy-cyclohex-1-enecarboxylate
 (4R,5S,6S)-4-ammonio-5-[(1-carboxylatoethenyl)oxy]-6-hydroxycyclohex-1-ene-1-carboxylate
 (4R,5S,6S)-5-[(1-carboxylatoethenyl)oxy]-4,6-dihydroxycyclohex-1-ene-1-carboxylate
 Cu2+
 Hg2+
 K+
 Mg2+ at concentrations above 1 mM
 N-ethylmaleimide

Nomenclature 
The systematic name of this enzyme is isochorismate hydroxymutase, and the common name is isochorismate synthase.  Other names for this enzyme include:
 Isochorismate mutase
 Menaquinone-specific isochorismate synthase
 MenF

Pathways 

MenF is a gene that codes for the isochorismate synthase found in the menaquinone pathway in Escherichia coli, not to be mistaken for the entC gene that codes for the isochorismate synthase found in the enterobactin pathway in Escherichia coli. This enzyme catalyzes the first step in the biosynthesis of salicylic acid in Pseudomonas aeruginosa.
Isochorismate synthase has several other homologs that are found in other organisms.  These include:

References 

EC 5.4.4